Gérard Klein (born 1937), known also as Gilles , is a French science fiction writer with sociological training.

He is the editor of the prestigious science fiction series Ailleurs et Demain published by Robert Laffont and of the Le Livre de Poche science-fiction imprint.

In his novella Les virus ne parlent pas ("The viruses do not speak"), he imagines that viruses have created all living beings in the same fashion that human beings have created computers, and for the same reason: to improve their efficiency.

Klein used the pseudonym "Gilles d'Argyre" for his novels published by Editions Fleuve Noir for their series Anticipation.

Several of his novels were published in translation by DAW Books in the United States.

Bibliography
 Agent Galactique [Galactic Agent] (under the pseudonym of Mark Starr) (1958) 
 Embûches dans l'Espace [Ambushes in Space] (co-written with Richard Chomet & Patrice Rondard under the pseudonym of François Pagery) (1958)
 Le Gambit des Étoiles (1958; transl. as Starmasters' Gambit, 1973)
 Les Perles du Temps [The Pearls of Time] (1958)
 Chirurgiens d'une Planète [The Planet Surgeons] (under the pseudonym of Gilles d'Argyre) (1960); revised as Le Rêve des Forêts [A Dream of Forests] (1987), Argyre's saga volume 1
 Les Voiliers du Soleil [The Solar Sailors] (under the pseudonym of Gilles d'Argyre) (1961), Argyre's saga volume 2
 Le Temps n'a pas d'Odeur [Time Has No Scent] (1963; transl. as The Day Before Tomorrow, 1972)
 Le Long Voyage [The Long Journey] (under the pseudonym of Gilles d'Argyre) (1964), Argyre's saga volume 3
 Les Tueurs de Temps [The Time Killers] (under the pseudonym of Gilles d'Argyre) (1965; transl. as The Mote in Time's Eye, 1975)
 Un Chant de Pierre [A Song of Stone] (1966)
 Le Sceptre du Hasard [The Scepter of Chance] (under the pseudonym of Gilles d'Argyre) (1968)
 Les Seigneurs de la Guerre (1971; transl. by John Brunner as The Overlords of War, 1973)
 La Loi du Talion [The Law of Retaliation] (1973)
 Histoires Comme Si... [Stories As If...] (1975)

External links

1937 births
French science fiction writers
French speculative fiction critics
French speculative fiction editors
French speculative fiction translators
Science fiction editors
Science fiction critics
Living people
French male novelists
French male non-fiction writers